Eois verisimilis is a moth in the  family Geometridae. It is found on Sumbawa.

References

Moths described in 1922
Eois
Moths of Indonesia